Tobata may refer to:

 46596 Tobata, a main-belt minor planet
 Seiichi Tobata, a Japanese professor of agriculture
 Tobata-ku, Kitakyūshū, a ward in Fukuoka, Japan
 Tobata Station, a railway station on the Kagoshima Main Line, Japan